The crimson Rivers is a 2000 French psychological thriller film starring Jean Reno and Vincent Cassel. The film, which was directed by Mathieu Kassovitz, is based on the novel Blood Red Rivers by Jean-Christophe Grangé. The screenplay was written by Grangé and Mathieu Kassovitz.

The film is about two detectives who investigate a series of grisly murders in and around an isolated university campus in a deep valley of the French Alps. With a $14 million budget, the movie went on to gross $60 million from a worldwide theatrical release. Despite its box office success, one of its stars, Vincent Cassel, admitted, "I can't help explain the film because I didn't understand it! We cut out everything in the film that was explanatory, therefore 'boring' [according to the director]. You end up with a film that's not boring but you don't understand it [at] all".

A sequel, Crimson Rivers II: Angels of the Apocalypse (Les Rivières pourpres II: Les Anges de l'apocalypse), was released in 2004 and a sequel tv series sequel, titled The Crimson Rivers, aired in 2018.

Plot

Detective Superintendent (Commissaire Principal) Pierre Niemans (Jean Reno), a well-known Parisian police investigator, is sent to the small university town of Guernon in the French Alps to investigate a brutal murder. The victim's body was found  bound in a foetal position and suspended high on a cliff face, his eyes removed and his hands cut off. Niemans learns that the victim was a professor and the university's librarian, Remy Callois, and he seeks out a local ophthalmologist for an explanation regarding the removal of the eyes. Dr Cherneze (Jean-Pierre Cassel), once on the university staff, explains that the school's isolation led to inbreeding amongst the professors, with increasingly serious genetic disorders. Recently the trend has reversed, with the local village children becoming ill and the college babies remaining healthy, something that the local villagers somehow blame on the unpopular and arrogant faculty members. Cherneze hints that the killer is leaving Niemans clues to their motive by removing the body parts that are unique to each individual – the eyes and hands. Niemans questions the Dean (Didier Flamand) and examines the librarian's apartment, where he finds images of athletic "supermen" juxtaposed with texts on genetic deformities. The Dean's assistant (and son) Hubert (Laurent Lafitte) translates the title of Callois's Ph.D. thesis as, "We are the masters. We are the slaves. We are everywhere. We are nowhere. We control the crimson rivers."

Coincidentally Detective Inspector (Lieutenant de Police) Max Kerkerian (Vincent Cassel) is in the nearby town of Sarzac investigating the desecration of the grave of Judith Herault, a girl who died in 1982, and the theft of her photos from the local primary school. Another grave of yet another girl who died of pneumonia in the same year shows signs of an earlier desecration. Judith Herault was killed in a horrific highway accident while travelling with her family and her body only found months later. The mother was the only survivor and was so traumatized that years later she took a vow of darkness in a nunnery. The mother tells Kerkerian that when Judith was ten she broke her wrist, and they went to get help at the faculty's hospital in Guernon where she was born; she claims they were attacked by "demons" on their way back and, when they fled, her husband and her daughter were killed in the road accident. She says the pictures were stolen to erase her daughter from history, and that her face is a threat to the demons who have returned to complete their mission. She tells him it all began in Guernon.

Niemans questions Fanny Ferreira (Nadia Farès), a glaciologist and a faculty child, who is immediately suspect because of her climbing ability and due to the fact that she is the fiancée of the Dean's son, something that she denies. Despite being a faculty child herself, she lives outside the premises and shows contempt for the school and its arrogant professors. She works for the university to steer away frequent avalanches, and is incensed when Niemans implies she might withhold evidence to protect the school. She tells him that anyone with good equipment could've hoisted the body up the cliff, and brushes off his obvious attraction. Niemans breaks into the dead librarian's office and finds details on the faculty history. He discovers that it was founded during the Second World War and financed with Nazi-money. The original faculty-staff were intellectuals who believed in creating a super-race based not on physical criteria but on intellectuality, and that was the real reason for their original inbreeding-problems.

Soon after, the pathologist (François Levantal) reports that it was acid rain in Callois's eye sockets, which has not fallen in the area since the seventies. Niemans enlists Fanny to take him up the glacier to get ice samples to compare with the acid-rain in Callois's eyes. On a hunch, Niemans follows a glacial melt tunnel to a cave that contains a second body, frozen into the ice.

Kerkerian traces a car from the 1982 accident to Phillip Sertys in Guernon and meets Niemans while attempting to break into Sertys's apartment. Sertys is the body in the ice, a doctor that worked in the maternity ward at the University hospital. They find the stolen pictures of Judith Herault and evidence that Sertys was breeding and training fighting dogs – and then they find the dogs, and Niemans the "supercop" is momentarily paralyzed by fear, until Kerkerian coaxes him through.

Sertys was also mutilated, and his eyes replaced with glass prosthetics, "Like you would find at an eye-doctors" remarks the pathologist, leading Niemans to race back to Cherneze's practice. The doctor is already dead, and they almost catch the killer, who fights off Niemans and races away after deliberately emptying Niemans's gun into the wall but not hitting him. Kerkerian gives chase but the killer escapes. Returning to the scene, where the killer has written "I will trace the source of the crimson rivers" in Cherneze's own blood above his body, they learn the prints on Niemans's gun belong to Judith Herault.

Kerkerian goes back to search the grave in Sarzac, which is empty except for a picture of an adult woman with Judith's name, while Niemans goes to Fanny's home. Niemans tells her that although he sees her as physically capable of committing the crimes he doesn't believe her to be guilty. When he returns to the university, the local police captain (Karim Belkhadra) tells him that Callois's thesis is full of Nazi-style eugenics, suggesting perfection can be achieved by breeding athletically- and intellectually-gifted children together.

Kerkerian returns with the photo from the grave Niemans recognizes as Fanny and, on the way to her house, they narrowly avoid being run off the road by the Dean's son as they piece together the story: Due to the poor bloodlines and genetic mutations in the faculty's inbred offspring, the doctors at the hospital had been swapping healthy village children with the university children and Callois arranged the matches between both types of children in the college's breeding-program. Sertys, they deduce, must have swapped Fanny for one of the dead faculty babies while leaving her identical twin, Judith, with her birth family as a control subject. When Judith was brought to the hospital because of her broken wrist, her mother saw pictures of Fanny and realized that she was her stolen daughter. The family fled the hospital and were pursued by members of the faculty who caused the accident that killed the husband. The mother hid Judith and later on falsely identified the stolen body of the girl who died of pneumonia as her daughter's, keeping Judith inside their house at all times. As the mother slowly descended into madness and took refuge as a nun, Judith sought Fanny and told her the whole story. Fanny now hid Judith, who could go out pretending to be Fanny and it was Judith who left her picture in her desecrated grave as a clue.

Once at Fanny's house they find the missing hands and eyes of the victims in her basement, but Fanny is now gone and so are her grenades. Niemans gives the order to evacuate the university while he and Kerkerian travel up the mountain to find Fanny. The duo confront Fanny only to be set upon by Judith, who is now as mad as their mother and who committed the crimes. Judith tells Fanny to kill Niemans, but she refuses, and instead turns the gun on her sister. At the same time Kerkerian fires at Judith, but hits Fanny in the shoulder and the gunshots trigger an avalanche. Judith is swept away and the rest are buried in the snow until a rescue team arrives with search dogs. Fanny is airlifted to hospital while Kerkerian asks Niemans to explain his fear of dogs.

Cast

Production

Exteriors were shot on location near Grenoble in the communes of Albertville, Livet-et-Gavet, Avrieux, Apprieu, Bourg d'Oisans, Vallorcine, Vinay and Virieu sur Bourbre.

The university was actually the Onera Modane-Avrieux wind tunnels Centre at Villarodin-Bourget, Savoy. The glacier scenes were filmed on the Mer de Glace beneath Mont-Blanc and above Argentiere in the Chamonix Valley, Haute-Savoie.

Reception
The Crimson Rivers holds a 68% approval rating on Rotten Tomatoes, based on 53 reviews with an average rating of 6.01/10. It was nominated for five César Awards: Best Director, Best Cinematography, Best Music, Best Editing, and Best Sound.

The film grossed an estimated $16 million in France and $60 million worldwide.

References

External links

 

2000 films
2000 crime thriller films
2000 psychological thriller films
Films directed by Mathieu Kassovitz
French crime thriller films
French detective films
French psychological thriller films
French police films
Police detective films
Gaumont Film Company films
Screen Gems films
TriStar Pictures films
Films based on French novels
Films based on crime novels
Films scored by Bruno Coulais
2000s French films